Satureja coerulea, called blue savory, is a species of flowering plant in the genus Satureja, native to Bulgaria, Romania, and Turkey, including East Thrace. A perennial reaching 25cm, it has gained the Royal Horticultural Society's Award of Garden Merit as an ornamental. It prefers to grow in limestone and granite soils on exposed rocky slopes.

References

Lamiaceae
Flora of Bulgaria
Flora of Romania
Flora of Turkey
Plants described in 1891